North Seattle College (NSC or North Seattle) is a public college in Seattle, Washington. It is one of three colleges comprising the Seattle Colleges District and part of the Washington Community and Technical Colleges system.

Founded  in 1970, NSC is accredited by the Northwest Commission on Colleges and Universities, and offers associate degrees, bachelor's degrees, university transfer, and certificate programs, as well as continuing education and college preparation programs.

In March 2014, the board of trustees of the Seattle Community Colleges District voted unanimously to change the name of the district to "Seattle Colleges" and North Seattle Community College became North Seattle College.

Academics
NSC programs include academic degrees, college prep and transfer, cross-disciplinary, continuing and senior adult education programs. NSC is also home to the Watch Technology Institute, the only two-year program in the art of Swiss watchmaking and technology in the western United States.
NSC also provides Running Start, where high school juniors and seniors can take college classes to earn high school credits as well as college credits.

Since 2010, as part of a new Washington State educational initiative, North Seattle College began offering Bachelor of Applied Science (BAS) degree programs to students that have previously completed a two-year degree.

Campus
The North Seattle College main campus occupies , including  of environmentally sensitive wetlands, in the Licton Springs/North College Park neighborhood of the Northgate district of Seattle.

NSC campus consists of various academic, athletics & supporting facilities:

The college's library was founded in 1970; as of 2017, it contains over 174,000 volumes (books, media, serials) in the physical and digital collection, along with 40 plus databases that provide access to many thousands of scholarly, popular, trade, and newspaper articles.
The Computer Lab facilities & laboratories
North Seattle Indoor Arena, Physical Education, gymnasium, fitness & wellness center
NSC Bookstore
NSC Art Gallery

Wetlands
The North Seattle College Wetlands sit at the South Fork of Thornton Creek and are important ecological lands for the Thornton Creek watershed as they work as a sponge to hold surge flows of water as well as filtering out pollutants.  The wetlands serve as a critical habitat for many species including the Pacific Tree Frog and Long-toed salamander, as well as several species of avian and plant life.

Currently, there is a system of crude trails that get you to and through most of the wetlands habitat. The main trail is a loop that walks around the northern part of campus.  There are spurs that branch off of this main loop trail.  An interpretive trail is in progress and a map is available with points of interest for those wishing to explore the wetlands further.

A wide variety of native and non-native plant species can be observed throughout the main campus and surrounding wetlands habitat.
There are many mushrooms growing in and around the wetlands. Some notable species include Redlead Roundhead (Stropharia aurantiaca), Harefoot Mushroom (Coprinopsis lagopus), Fiber Caps (Inocybe mixtilis), Shaggy Parasol (Chlorophyllum olvieri), and Bellybutton Hedgehog (Hydnum umbilicatum).

Wetlands shrub life includes Snowberry Shrubs (Symphoricarpos albus), Himalayan Blackberry (Rubus discolor), Burning Bush (Eunonymus alatus), and Nootka Rose (Rosa Nutkana). Campus and wetlands are also home to many plants such as Sumac (Rhus Species), Yarrow (Achillea millefolium), Sword Fern (Polystichum munitum), and Common Horsetail (Equisetum arvense).

See also 
Thornton Creek
Licton Springs

References

External links 

Official website

Universities and colleges in Seattle
Community colleges in Washington (state)
Universities and colleges accredited by the Northwest Commission on Colleges and Universities
Educational institutions established in 1970
Libraries in Seattle
1970 establishments in Washington (state)